The Legend of Lucy Keyes is a 2006 suspense mystery film directed and written by John Stimpson, and starring Julie Delpy, Justin Theroux and Brooke Adams. The film premiered at the 2006 Santa Barbara Film Festival.

Summary
After losing their youngest daughter Anna (Madeline O'Brian), Guy Cooley (Justin Theroux) moves to an old farm in Princeton with his wife Jeanne Cooley (Julie Delpy) and their two daughters, Molly and Lucy to build eight windmills to generate clean power to the city. He was hired by a local named Samantha Porter (Brooke Adams), who, with her relative Jonas Dodd (Mark Boone Junior), owns the lands in the woods where the facility will be built. The Cooley family experiences a cold reception in town, and while voting for the approval of the project, an old woman named Gretchen Caswell (Jamie Donnelly) votes against the construction (along with several other people) and mentions the historic importance of the spot and the name of Martha. Jeanne researches and discovers that two hundred and fifty years ago, a girl called Lucy Keyes got lost in the woods and in spite of the efforts of her mother Martha Keyes and the locals, she was never found. When the ghost of Martha comes to the fields around their property calling for Lucy, Jeanne realizes that the legend is true and that there are many hidden secrets in that location.  The mom found out that Lucy died and her body was in the woods.  Now that they're all dead, people say that they can still hear the mom calling for Lucy.  Jeanne's Lucy snoops around the neighborhood because she sees Lucy Keyes and wants to help her. She almost ends up like Lucy Keyes when she helps Jeanne discover the true story of how Lucy Keyes disappeared.

Cast
Julie Delpy as Jeanne Cooley
Justin Theroux as Guy Cooley
Brooke Adams as Samantha Porter
Mark Boone Jr. as  Jonas Dodd
Jamie Donnelly as Gretchen Caswell
Michele Greene as Sheila Travers
Cassidy Hinkle as Lucy Cooley
Kathleen Regan as Molly Cooley
Tom Kemp as Bill Kemper
Ken Cheeseman as Bud Travers
Anna Friedman as Lucy Keyes
Rachel Harker as Martha Keyes
David Ian as Eli Farnum
Charlie Broderick as Bob Greenwood
Jillian Wheeler as Anna Keyes
Madeline O'Brien as Anna Cooley
Sarah Newhouse as Mary Sawyer
Elizabeth Duff as Librarian
Frank T. Wells as Mechanic
Bates Wilder as Deputy Officer
Jim Spencer as Native American

Production
Writer/Director John Stimpson moved to Princeton, Massachusetts and learned about the legend of Lucy Keyes. Lucy Keyes disappeared from the Wachusett woods on April 14, 1755. To this day nobody knows what happened to her. The legend spurred Stimpson to write and direct a film based on the events.

Reception
Variety said of the film "Mild scares rustle the autumnal mood of 'The Legend of Lucy Keyes,' a modest New England psychological horror tale that could easily be dubbed 'Amityville Jr.'"

References

External links
Official Website
 

2006 horror films
American psychological horror films
2000s ghost films
Films based on urban legends
Horror films based on actual events
Mystery films based on actual events
Films set in Massachusetts
Princeton, Massachusetts
2006 films
2000s supernatural horror films
American ghost films
2000s American films